The Romanian-language surname Nergescu is derived from the word negru, "black". 

The surname may refer to:
Igor Negrescu, Moldavian professional football manager and former footballer
Ion Negrescu, Romanian politician
William Pierpont Black, born Wilhelm Peter Negrescu, was a New Zealand wood carver, journal editor and publisher, journalist

Romanian-language surnames